Lachnostachys verbascifolia is a plant in the Lamiaceae family, endemic to Western Australia.

Description
Lachnostachys verbascifolia is a shrub growing from  0.3 to 1.3 m high. Its leaves are obtuse and its bracts are covered in white. Its flowers are purple to white, with flowering occurring from June to November.

Distribution
It is found in the IBRA regions of: the Avon Wheatbelt,  the Jarrah Forest, and the Murchison bioregion, on sandy soils in shrublands and woodlands.

Taxonomy
Lachnostachys verbascifolia was first described in 1868 by Ferdinand von Mueller from a specimen, K000975361, found by James Drummond in Western Australia.

Gallery

References

verbascifolia
Flora of Western Australia
Taxa named by Ferdinand von Mueller
Plants described in 1868